Stemmatophora honestalis is a species of snout moth in the genus Stemmatophora. It was described by Georg Friedrich Treitschke in 1829. It is found in Spain and on the Balkan Peninsula and North Africa.

References

Moths described in 1829
Pyralini
Moths of Europe
Moths of Africa